Simone Cerdan (1897–1967) was a French singer and film actress.

Selected filmography
 Marquitta (1927)
 Departure (1931)
 The Unknown Singer (1931)
 Beauty Spot (1932)
 Our Lord's Vineyard (1932)
 Clochard (1932)
 Night Warning (1946)

References

Bibliography
 Chris Fujiwara. Jacques Tourneur: The Cinema of Nightfall. McFarland, 2013.

External links

1897 births
1967 deaths
French silent film actresses
20th-century French actresses
French stage actresses
People from Fontainebleau
20th-century French women singers